Eacles penelope is a moth of the  family Saturniidae. It is found in South America, including Ecuador.

The wingspan reaches 185 mm.

The larvae feed on oak.

External links
 Images

Ceratocampinae
Moths described in 1775
Taxa named by Pieter Cramer